Yearinan is an unbounded locality in north-western New South Wales, Australia, within the locality of Bugaldie. A railway station on the closed Gwabegar railway line was located there between 1923 and 1974.

References

Localities in New South Wales
Warrumbungle Shire